Rauvolfioideae is a subfamily of the flowering plant family Apocynaceae (order Gentianales). Many species are woody lianas, others are shrubs or perennial herbs.

Tribes and genera
To date (2022), eleven tribes have been erected:

Aspidospermateae
Authority: Miers, 1878
 Aspidosperma Mart. & Zucc., 1924
 Geissospermum Allemão, 1846
 Haplophyton A.DC., 1844 
 Microplumeria Baill., 1899
 Strempeliopsis Benth., 1876
 Vallesia Ruiz & Pav., 1794

Alstonieae
Authority: G. Don, 1837
 Alstonia R. Br., 1810
 Dyera Hook. F., 1882

Vinceae
Authority: Duby, 1828
subtribe Kopsiinae Leeuwenb., 1994
 Kopsia Blume, 1823
subtribe Ochrosiinae Pichon ex Boiteau, 1981
 Ochrosia Juss, 1789
subtribe Tonduziinae M.E. Endress, 2014
 Laxoplumeria Markgr., 1926
 Tonduzia Pittier, 1908
subtribe Vincinae M.E. Endress, 2014
 Vinca L., 1853
subtribe Catharanthinae Pichon ex Boiteau, 1981
 Catharanthus G. Don, 1837
 Kamettia Kostel., 1834
 Petchia Livera, 1926
subtribe Rauvolfiinae Benth. & Hook.f., 1876
 Rauvolfia L., 1753

Willughbeieae
Authority: A.DC., 1844
subtribe Leuconotidinae Pichon ex Leeuwenb., 1994
 Bousigonia Pierre, 1898
 Cyclocotyla Stapf, 1908
 Leuconotis Jack, 1823
subtribe Willughbeiinae A.DC., 1844
 Willughbeia Roxb., 1820
subtribe Lacmelleinae Pichon ex Leeuwenb., 1994
 Couma Aubl., 1775
 Hancornia Gomes, 1803
 Lacmellea H. Karst., 1857
 Parahancornia Ducke, 1922
subtribe Landolphiinae K. Schum., 1895
 Ancylobothrys Pierre, 1898
 Chamaeclitandra (Stapf) Pichon, 1953
 Clitandra Benth., 1849
 Cylindropsis Pierre, 1898
 Dictyophleba Pierre, 1898
 Landolphia P. Beauv., 1804
 Orthopichonia H. Huber, 1962
 Pacouria Aubl., 1775
 Saba (Pichon) Pichon, 1953
 Vahadenia Stapf, 1902

Tabernaemontaneae
Authority: G. Don, 1838
subtribe Ambelaniinae A.O. Simões & M.E. Endress, 2010
 Ambelania Aubl., 1775
 Macoubea Aubl., 1775
 Molongum Pichon, 1948
 Mucoa Zarucchi, 1988
 Neocouma Pierre, 1898
 Rhigospira Miers, 1878
 Spongiosperma Zarucchi, 1988
subtribe Tabernaemontaninae A.DC., 1844
 Callichilia Stapf, 1902
 Calocrater K. Schum., 1895
 Carvalhoa K. Schum., 1895
 Crioceras Pierre, 1897
 Schizozygia Baill., 1888
 Tabernaemontana L., 1753
 Tabernanthe Baill., 1888
 Voacanga Thouars, 1806

Melodineae
Authority: G. Don, 1837
 Diplorhynchus Welw. ex Ficalho & Hiern., 1881
 Craspidospermum Bojer ex A. DC., 1844
 Melodinus J.R. Forst. & G. Forst., 1776
 Pycnobotrya Benth., 1876
 Stephanostegia Baill., 1888

Hunterieae
Authority: Miers, 1878
 Gonioma E. Mey., 1938
 Hunteria Roxb., 1824
 Picralima Pierre, 1896
 Pleiocarpa Benth., 1876

Amsonieae
Authority: M.E. Endress, 2014
 Amsonia Walter, 1788

Alyxieae
Authority: G. Don, 1837
subtribe Condylocarpinae Pichon ex Leeuwenb., 1994
 Chilocarpus Blume, 1895
 Condylocarpon Desf., 1822
 Plectaneia Thouars, 1806
subtribe Alyxiinae A.DC., 1844
 Alyxia Banks ex R. Br., 1810
 Lepinia Decne., 1849
 Lepiniopsis Valeton, 1895
 Pteralyxia K. Schum., 1895

Plumerieae
Authority: E. Mey., 1838
subtribe Allamandinae A.DC., 1844
 Allamanda L., 1771
subtribe Plumeriinae Pichon ex Leeuwenb., 1994
 Himatanthus Willd. ex. Schult., 1819
 Mortoniella Woodson, 1939
 Plumeria L., 1753
subtribe Thevetiinae A.DC., 1844
 Anechites Griseb., 1861
 Cameraria L., 1753
 Cerbera L., 1753
 Cerberiopsis Viell. ex Pancher & Sébert, 1874
 Skytanthus Meyen, 1834
 Thevetia L., 1758

Carisseae
Authority: Dumort, 1829
 Acokanthera G. Don, 1838
 Carissa L., 1767

References

Exyternal Links

 
Gentianales subfamilies